The Secretary for Commerce and Economic Development heads the Commerce and Economic Development Bureau of the Hong Kong Government. The Secretary is responsible for promoting commerce and the economic development of Hong Kong.  The position was created in 2007 by merging the previous portfolios of the Secretary for Commerce, Industry and Technology and the Secretary for Economic Development and Labour.

The predecessor, Secretary for Trade and Industry, was the head of the Trade and Industry Branch, and later the Trade and Industry Bureau, responsible for securing Hong Kong's access to the world market, helping Hong Kong manufacturers remain competitive in international markets, enhancing the protection of intellectual property rights, and promoting Hong Kong customers' interests. It was renamed and re-organised as the Secretary for Commerce and Industry in 2000, and replaced by the Secretary for Commerce, Industry and Technology in 2002, with new responsibilities of technology sectors after merging with Secretary for Information Technology and Broadcasting.

List of office holders

Secretaries for Trade and Industry, 1982–1997

Secretaries for Trade and Industry, 1997–2000

Secretaries for Commerce and Industry, 2000–2002

Secretaries for Commerce, Industry and Technology, 2002–2007

Secretaries for Commerce and Economic Development, 2007–present
Political party:

References

External links

Organisation chart of Hong Kong Government

Commerce and Economic Development